The Slavonic and East European Review, the journal of the UCL School of Slavonic and East European Studies (University College London), is a quarterly peer-reviewed academic journal covering Slavonic and East European Studies. It was established in 1922 by Bernard Pares, Robert Seton-Watson, and Harold Williams and published by the Modern Humanities Research Association. The editor-in-chief is Martyn Rady (School of Slavonic and East European Studies).

External links

 Vol 10 (June 1931)
 Vol 11 (July 1932) 
 Vol 12 (July 1933) 
 Vol 13 (1934)
 Vol 14 (1935) 
 15 (1936)
 Vol 16 (1937) 
 Vol 17 (1938)
 Vol 25 (November 1946)
 Vol 28 (November 1949)

Slavic studies journals
Publications established in 1922
Quarterly journals
English-language journals